Fonzerelli is a DJ and music producer from the UK.

Biography
His 2006 single, "Moonlight Party", charted in the Netherlands, Finland and Australia. Fonzerelli's remix of J. Majik & Wickaman's "Crazy World" is featured on the Grand Theft Auto IV soundtrack on Vladivostok FM.

Fonzerelli has also remixed for various UK artists and labels; most notably "Now You're Gone" and "All I Ever Wanted", featured on Basshunter's Platinum selling Now You're Gone – The Album. He also had his own productions and remixes played on Saturday nights on BBC Radio 1 than any other artist in 2006 and 2007, as DJ Judge Jules was a massive supporter of Fonzerelli's work on his Saturday warmup show.

His single "Dreamin' (Of A Hot Summers Night)" hit number 2 in the DMC Buzz Chart and number 6 in the Cool Cuts Chart.

Many of the world's major and influential labels have commissioned Fonzerelli remixes for acts such as Fedde Le Grand, J. Majik & Wickerman, Chanel, Sash!, Mauro Picotto, Beatfreakz and Tiësto featuring Maxi Jazz and Basshunter as well as original material for his own Mena Music label and Big in Ibiza.

Fonzerelli's debut single "Moonlight Party" was championed by Tiësto and soon became the number 1 selling download of 2006 on download store DJ Download.

Discography

Charting singles

References

DJs from Northern Ireland
British house musicians
Living people
Year of birth missing (living people)